Kazachstania exigua is a yeast species that commonly occurs in olive brine and in some kefir cultures. It is one of the yeast species used in the production of sourdough. It is acid-tolerant and maltose-negative.

References

Saccharomycetaceae